Charles Pachter,  D.F.A. LL. D. (born December 30, 1942 in Toronto, Ontario) is a Canadian contemporary artist. He is a painter, printmaker, sculptor, designer, historian, and lecturer. He studied French literature at the Sorbonne, art history at the University of Toronto, and painting and graphics at the Cranbrook Academy of Art in Bloomfield Hills, Michigan.

His work has been shown at the Art Gallery of Ontario, the Royal Ontario Museum, and the McMichael Canadian Art Collection, Kleinburg. His mural, Hockey Knights in Canada, Les Rois de l'Arène, can be seen at Toronto's College subway station, where the Montreal Canadiens face the Toronto Maple Leafs across the tracks. He holds honorary doctorates from Brock University, the Ontario College of Art & Design and the University of Toronto (2010). He was named a Member of the Order of Canada in 1999, and promoted to Officer in 2011.

Pachter lives and works beside Grange Park in an award-winning residence and studio designed by Canadian architect Stephen Teeple. His work is on permanent display in his adjoining Moose Factory gallery. His work has influenced a generation of young Canadian artists, including the sculptor Harley Valentine.

Awards
Officer of the Order of Canada
Chevalier of France's Order of Arts and Letters
 Queen's Jubilee medal
 Order of Ontario

References

External links

Pachter Hall and Moose Factory
"Charles Pachter", Artnet
"Charles Pachter", Askart

University of Paris alumni
Cranbrook Academy of Art alumni
1942 births
Living people
20th-century Canadian painters
Canadian male painters
21st-century Canadian painters
Canadian printmakers
Canadian designers
Artists from Toronto
Officers of the Order of Canada
Members of the Order of Ontario
20th-century Canadian sculptors
Canadian male sculptors
20th-century Canadian male artists
20th-century Canadian printmakers
21st-century Canadian male artists
Jewish Canadian artists
Canadian LGBT artists
21st-century Canadian LGBT people
20th-century Canadian LGBT people